Raija Simola (born 28 April 1932) is a Finnish gymnast. She competed in seven events at the 1952 Summer Olympics.

References

1932 births
Living people
Finnish female artistic gymnasts
Olympic gymnasts of Finland
Gymnasts at the 1952 Summer Olympics
Sportspeople from Lahti